External arcuate fibers may refer to:

 Anterior external arcuate fibers
 Posterior external arcuate fibers